This is a timeline of GitHub, a web-based Git or version control repository and Internet hosting service.

Big picture

Full timeline

See also 
 Censorship of GitHub
 Timeline of social media
 Timeline of online food deliveryAnnouncing Open Source Guides
 Timeline of online advertising

References

GitHub
GitHub